Krysk Nowy  is a village in the administrative district of Gmina Naruszewo, within Płońsk County, Masovian Voivodeship, in east-central Poland.

References

Krysk Nowy